Radovan Ćurčić (born 10 January 1972) is a Serbian football manager and former player.

Football career

Playing
Ćurčić started out at his hometown club Javor Ivanjica, before going on to play for OFK Beograd, Gorica and Borac Čačak. He eventually finished his playing career at his parent club Javor Ivanjica.

During his last spell with Javor Ivanjica, Ćurčić was the top scorer of the 2001–02 Second League of FR Yugoslavia (Group West) with 24 goals, thus leading the club to the First League. In the club's first season in the top flight since its foundation, Ćurčić scored five league goals, but failed to save the club from relegation.

Managerial
Upon his retirement as a player in 2003, Ćurčić was named manager of Javor Ivanjica. He then worked at Borac Čačak in the 2006–07 season, before returning to Javor Ivanjica. He led them to promotion to the Serbian SuperLiga in 2008, with an unbeaten record. In April 2010, Ćurčić briefly took charge of the Serbia national team by replacing Radomir Antić for a friendly away at Japan, eventually winning the game 3–0.

Between 2010 and 2011, Ćurčić served as assistant manager to Vladimir Petrović while Petrović was manager of Serbia. He was caretaker manager of the national team from October 2011 until April 2012. Ćurčić then led the Serbia U21s to the 2015 UEFA Under-21 Championship. He was again named caretaker manager of the Serbian national team in November 2014, before being officially appointed as manager later the same month. On 27 April 2016, it was announced that Ćurčić left the position by mutual consent. On 29 April 2018, Ćurčić was appointed as the new head coach of Muangthong United.

Managerial statistics

Honours
Individual
 Serbian Coach of the Year: 2014

References

External links
 PrvaLiga profile
 

1972 births
Living people
People from Ivanjica
Association football forwards
Expatriate footballers in Slovenia
FK Borac Čačak managers
FK Borac Čačak players
FK Javor Ivanjica managers
FK Javor Ivanjica players
ND Gorica players
OFK Beograd players
Serbia national football team managers
Serbia national under-21 football team managers
Serbian football managers
Serbian footballers
Serbian SuperLiga managers
Slovenian PrvaLiga players
FK Partizan non-playing staff